Gold Teeth Thief is a live-recorded mixtape by DJ and producer DJ /rupture, which he self-released in 2001 as a CD-R and internet download. It was subsequently rereleased by Violent Turd, (a sublabel of Tigerbeat6) in August 2002 and named one of the "50 Records of the Year" by The Wire in 2001. The mixtape consists of forty-three tracks in sixty-eight minutes, including  breakcore, ragga and Arabic folk music, as well as popular music.

Track listing

part A
"Missy Elliott Get Ur Freak On (Elektra), Nas Oochie Wally instrumental (Columbia), Ricky Dog aka Bling Dog Risen to the Top (Massive Sounds)"
"DJ Scud Badman Time (Ambush)"
"Barrington Levy Here I Come - jungle (Greensleeves), Nettle Duende (Soot)"
"Dead Prez Cop Shot (Raptivism), Monie Muss Crew Thugz riddim (Greensleeves), Spragga Benz Certain Bwoy (Greensleeves)"
"Bounty Killer Corrupt System (Greensleeves), Snares Man Breakbeat Malaria (History of the Future), Tommy Zwedberg Hanging (Fylkingen), Kid606 Get yr kicks on Route 606 (Vinyl Communications), Luciano Berio Visage (Turnabout), Venetian Snares Boarded Up Swan Entrance (Planet Mu), Larbi Lamtougi Salhine Assalihate (Casaphone)"
"Nettle Duende: DJ Scud's In Chains remix (Soot), Shabba Ranks Peanie Peanie (Digital B)"
"Quincy Bruce Lee MC (Ninja Tune)"
"DJ /rupture Descarriada (Broklyn Beats)"

part B
"Dahlena Dabka (DJ Dance Records)"
"Non Phixion Four W's instrumental (Serchlite), Djivan Gasparyan Dle Yaman (Opal), Wu-Tang Clan Reunited Funkstörung's mix (K7!), Nettle untitled (white label)"
"Cannibal Ox Vein (Def Jux), Sub Dub Dawa Zango (theAgriculture)"
"DJ /rupture Rumbo Babylon (Broklyn Beats)"
"Missing Links No Lodge (Primeight), DJ /rupture Taqsim Distorsionada (Soot)"
"Rude Ass Tinker U Can't Touch This (Planet Mu), DJ /rupture feat. Mercedes Ferrer (white label), John Wall track 1 (Utterpsalm), Moosaka w/ Splice Airbrushing (Street Forest)"
"Welmo Romero & Splice Si A Plomo Vives: rupture's remix (Broklyn Beats)"
"Project Pat Chickenhead (Loud), Nettle Duppy (Soot)"
"Ilhan Mimaroglu Agony (Turnabout), Nettle Ensamblaje (Soot), Oval Shop In Store (Thrill Jockey)"
"Muslimgauze The Taliban (Jara), Paul Simon w/ Ladysmith Black Mambazo Homeless (Warner Bros.), Miriam Makeba Djiguinira (Syliphone)"

References

External links 
 Soot Records: DJ /rupture > Gold Teeth Thief mix - MP3 of Gold Teeth Thief on DJ /rupture website
 DJ /rupture: Gold Teeth Thief @ Discogs.com - album info
 http://www.stylusmagazine.com/review.php?ID=297 - Review of Gold Teeth Thief and Minesweeper in Stylus Magazine

DJ /rupture albums
2001 compilation albums